MSC Opera is a cruise ship built in 2004, carrying 2,679 passengers in 1,071 cabins, and with a crew complement of approximately 728, currently operated by Swiss company MSC Cruises. She served as the flagship of the company until  entered service in 2006.

Renaissance program
It was the third ship of the Lirica class to undergo renovation under the "Renaissance Program" and involved jumboisation to increase capacity, with the work being completed in the port of Palermo by Italian ship builders Fincantieri. New features included a spray park, refurbished shops, new child and teen areas, an enhanced buffet, a new lounge and an extended restaurant. The work was completed on 4 July 2015.

Incidents
In May 2010, one week after a similar incident on board , UK Border Agency officers at Dover found a large quantity of cocaine concealed in four passenger cabins. Four Latvians and three Lithuanians were later convicted at Canterbury Crown Court and sentenced to a total of 84 years imprisonment.

On 14 May 2011, MSC Opera suffered engine failure in the Baltic Sea and was towed to the port of Nynäshamn, south of Stockholm, where passengers were transferred to smaller vessels. Around 1,700 passengers were flown home from Stockholm during the day. The ship was without power after the engine failure and internet reports stated that bathrooms were inoperable, causing some sanitation issues. Passengers were given a voucher to cover the cost of the cruise. On 17 May 2011, the ship departed Nynäshamn en route to Gdynia in Poland for repairs.

On 24 March 2019, the Portuguese police of Madeira arrested twelve people on board her (arriving at the port of Funchal in Madeira from the Caribbean), after finding  of cocaine hidden in bags of chips.

On 2 June 2019, the ship collided with the quay and a docked river cruise ship moored at the San Basilio Pier in the Giudecca Canal in Venice, Italy. The cause was later found to be technical difficulties with the engines while under tow. She sustained superficial scratches, while the smaller river vessel was more damaged. Five people were slightly injured.

References

External links

Opera
Ships built in France
2003 ships